A Conspiracy So Immense: The World of Joe McCarthy is a Hardeman Prize-winning book by David Oshinsky first published in 1983 by Free Press and later reprinted by Oxford University Press. The book covers the life of Joseph McCarthy from his birth to his death.

References

1983 non-fiction books
American biographies
Biographies about politicians
Works about McCarthyism
Free Press (publisher) books